Geraldton may refer to:

 Geraldton (suburb), the central suburb of the City of Greater Geraldton 
 City of Greater Geraldton, the local government authority responsible for Geraldton
 City of Geraldton-Greenough, the former LGA (2007–2011)
 City of Geraldton, an earlier LGA (1988–2007)
 Electoral district of Geraldton, a district of the Western Australian Legislative Assembly centred on the city
 Geraldton, Ontario
Innisfail, Queensland was known as Geraldton until 1910.
, two ships of the Royal Australian Navy